Faegre Drinker Biddle & Reath, also known as Faegre Drinker, is a full-service international law firm and one of the 50 largest law firms headquartered in the United States. Faegre Drinker provides legal counseling and litigation to a wide range of clients across many practice areas. Additionally, Faegre Drinker Consulting, the firm's national advisory and advocacy practice, provides public and private clients with consulting services. The firm was formed in February 2020 following the merger of Faegre Baker Daniels LLP and Drinker Biddle & Reath.

History

Drinker Biddle & Reath 
Drinker, Biddle & Reath was founded in Philadelphia in 1849 by John Christian Bullitt.

Bullitt would go on to become a civic figure in Philadelphia, serving as a delegate to the Pennsylvania Constitutional Convention of 1873, and drafting the "Bullitt Bill" which eventually became the Philadelphia City Charter in 1887. He also founded the Fourth Street National Bank in 1886, and in 1871 he oversaw the brokerage firm merger that created Drexel, Morgan & Co., later renamed J.P. Morgan & Co. In 1863, Samuel Dickson joined Bullitt's firm. Dickson also began a long relationship between the firm and the University of Pennsylvania, acting as counsel to the university and serving on its board of trustees from 1881 until his death in 1915. Together, Bullitt and Dickson created one of the most successful and lucrative law offices in Philadelphia.

Henry S. Drinker Jr. joined the firm in 1904, became a partner in 1918, and was named counsel to the University of Pennsylvania in 1927. From the 1920s until the 1950s, Drinker was the executive voice of the firm. Charles J. Biddle joined the firm in 1924 as the firm's first lateral partner, bringing from his former firm several clients, including the Philadelphia Contributionship (the nation's oldest property insurance company, founded by Benjamin Franklin) and the Philadelphia Saving Fund Society (at the time the third-largest savings bank in the United States). Biddle became a partner in 1925 and was a major force at the firm for decades. Thomas Reath joined the firm in 1919.

At the turn of the 21st century, Drinker Biddle began a series of mergers that raised its national profile. In 1999, it merged with the prominent New Jersey general practice firm of Shanley & Fisher, P.C., with offices in northern New Jersey and, until 9/11, at One World Trade Center in New York City.  In 2001, Drinker Biddle merged with two more firms: the Philadelphia intellectual property firm of Seidel, Gonda, Lavorgna & Monaco and the San Francisco firm of Preuss Shanagher Zvoleff & Zimmer. In 2007, the firm merged with Chicago’s Gardner Carton & Douglas, giving Drinker Biddle a stronger presence in the Midwest and adding expertise in health law, employee benefits and executive compensation, hedge funds, and government and regulatory affairs. The Gardner merger also made Drinker Biddle, in terms of number of attorneys, one of the 75 largest law firms in the United States.

Baker & Daniels

Baker & Daniels was founded as Hendricks & Hord in Indianapolis, Indiana, in 1863. Then-U.S. Senator Thomas A. Hendricks, who later served as Governor of Indiana and Vice President of the United States under Grover Cleveland, partnered with Oscar Hord, a former Indiana Attorney General, to create the firm.

The first Baker at the firm was Conrad Baker, who also served as Governor of Indiana. Later, Albert Baker, the son of Conrad Baker, and Edward Daniels, the first Daniels at the firm, joined the practice. Following several name changes, the firm became known as Baker & Daniels in 1888. After that, Joseph Daniels, the son of Edward Daniels, joined the firm.

Faegre & Benson

Faegre & Benson was established in Minneapolis in 1886 as Cobb & Wheelwright, and was the largest law firm in the Twin Cities.

Faegre Baker Daniels
On January 1, 2012, Faegre & Benson and Baker & Daniels began business operations as Faegre Baker Daniels LLP. The combination was presented as a merger of equals: the combined firm had no official "headquarters" and the leaders of each original firm retained a management role. Faegre chair Andrew Humphrey became managing partner of the combined firm, while Baker & Daniels CEO Thomas Froehle, Jr. became its chief operating partner.

Faegre Baker Daniels's first new office opened on July 1, 2013: a Silicon Valley office in East Palo Alto, California, that initially focused on offering intellectual property services. In March 2017, the firm opened a Los Angeles office that offered business, employment, intellectual property and product liability litigation and consulting.

Faegre Baker Daniels reportedly represented USA Gymnastics in the investigation of former team doctor Larry Nassar and participated in reporting Nassar to the FBI during the summer of 2015.

Faegre Drinker Biddle & Reath 
In February 2020, Faegre Baker Daniels LLP and Drinker Biddle & Reath merged.

Practice areas
Faegre Drinker has more than 1,300 attorneys, consultants, and professionals in 21 locations in the United States, London, and Shanghai. The firm handles complex transactional, litigation, and regulatory matters. Clients range from emerging startups to multinational corporations.

The firm also includes Faegre Drinker Consulting, a division formed in 1985 and based in Washington, D.C. It is a national advisory and advocacy firm that acts as a full-service lobbying group.

References

External links
 

Law firms of the United States